Sosibia passalus is a species of phasmid or leaf insect of the genus Sosibia. It is found in Sri Lanka.

References

Phasmatodea
Insects of Asia
Insects described in 1859